Ibn Manzar was an 8th-century narrator of hadith.

He transmitted hadith from:
Ata ibn Abi Rabah

His hadith were quoted by
‘Abd ar-Razzaq as-San‘ani

See also
List of Islamic scholars

References

Year of birth missing
Year of death missing
Hadith narrators